Statistics of Swedish football Division 3 for the 1959 season.

League standings

Norra Norrland 1959

Mellersta Norrland 1959

Södra Norrland 1959

Norra Svealand 1959

Östra Svealand 1959

Västra Svealand 1959

Nordöstra Götaland 1959

Nordvästra Götaland 1959

Mellersta Götaland 1959

Sydöstra Götaland 1959

Sydvästra Götaland 1959

Södra Götaland 1959

Footnotes

References 

Swedish Football Division 3 seasons
3
Swed
Swed